Christian Ariel Serrón Acosta (born November 17, 1994 )  is a Uruguayan professional footballer who plays as an attacking midfielder for Fuerza Amarilla.

Club career
Vicente started his career playing with Rampla Juniors. He made his professional debut during the 2014/15 season.

Serrón signe for Fuerza Amarilla in January 2018.

References

1994 births
Living people
Uruguayan footballers
Uruguayan Primera División players
Club Atlético River Plate (Montevideo) players
Rampla Juniors players
Fuerza Amarilla S.C. footballers
Association football midfielders